The 2016 CAFL season, the first season in the history of the China Arena Football League (CAFL), began on October 1, 2016. On November 6, the Beijing Lions defeated the Qingdao Clipper to win the first China Bowl.

Draft
The league held its first draft on June 10, 2016. 120 players were drafted with 60 of them being Americans, including 43 who have Arena Football League experience. 60 players from China or players who are of Chinese descent were selected as well. On June 15, the league held a supplemental draft (rounds 21 to 22) in which an additional 12 players were selected.

Note: The picks are not in chronological order. They are a list of picks by team and the round they were selected in. For example, Guangzhou did not select first in every round.

 CN indicates Chinese national or of Chinese descent

Sources:

Regular season
Week 1

Week 2

Week 3

Week 4

Week 5

Standings

Sources:

Postseason
5th-place game

3rd-place game

China Bowl

Source:

Awards

Individual season awards
Note: The Steel-man is named for his "all around excellence at several positions". The Judge Spirit Award, named after CAFL founder Marty Judge, is given for "exemplifying football excellence, leadership and special contribution to the league".

Source:

All-Pro teams
All-Pro North Division All-Stars

Source:

All-Pro South Division All-Stars

Source:

Dream Team
The CAFL Dream Team was selected by fan vote.

Source:

References

China Arena Football League
2016 in American football
2016 in Chinese sport